The Men's 77 kilograms weightlifting event at the 2012 Summer Olympics in London, United Kingdom, took place at ExCeL London.

Summary
Total score was the sum of the lifter's best result in each of the snatch and the clean and jerk, with three lifts allowed for each lift.  In case of a tie, the lighter lifter won; if still tied, the lifter who took the fewest attempts to achieve the total score won.  Lifters without a valid snatch score did not perform the clean and jerk.

China's Lü Xiaojun set two world records with a lift of 175 kilograms in the snatch and a total weight of 379 kilograms. Lü Xiaojun planned to attempt 177 kg in the snatch after he made the 175 kg world record lift, but was not given a chance to perform his third attempt due to a timing miscommunication between the officials and coaches. China's Lu Haojie posted 170 kg in the snatch, and went on to lift 190 kg in the clean and jerk despite an elbow injury.

South Korea's Sa Jae-hyouk was forced to retire from the competition after he dislocated his elbow during his second snatch attempt.

Two lifters who were on the start list did not compete: Armenia's Tigran Martirosyan was forced to scratch from the competition due to a back injury during the warm-up, while Albania's Hysen Pulaku was ejected from the Games after he tested positive for stanozolol.

Schedule
All times are British Summer Time (UTC+01:00)

Records

Results

New records

References 

Results 

Weightlifting at the 2012 Summer Olympics
Men's events at the 2012 Summer Olympics